The Streptacididae is an extinct taxonomic family of fossil sea snails, marine gastropod mollusks in the informal group Lower Heterobranchia.

References 

 The Taxonomicon

 
Gastropod families
Prehistoric gastropods